UiPath is a global software company that makes robotic process automation (RPA) software. It was founded in Bucharest, Romania, by Daniel Dines and Marius Tîrcă. Its headquarters are in New York City. The company's software monitors user activity to automate repetitive front and back office tasks, including those performed using other business software such as customer relationship management or enterprise resource planning (ERP) software.

In December 2020, the company filed confidentially for an initial public offering, and became public on April 21, 2021.

History 
UiPath was founded in 2005 in Bucharest, Romania as DeskOver, by Romanian entrepreneurs Daniel Dines and Marius Tîrcă.

In 2013, the company released the first UiPath Desktop Automation product line, which gave companies RPA tools to automate manual and repetitive back office tasks.

In 2015, the company changed its name to UiPath. Also in 2015, after receiving seed funding from Accel Partners and earlier investors, the company also opened offices in London, New York City, Bangalore, Paris, Singapore, Washington, D.C., and Tokyo.

By April 2016, the company had released its Front Office and Back Office Server suites, and also released its Studio Community Edition. Within six months, the company had 10,000 active members, and more than 250 enterprise customers.

In 2017, UiPath reported 590 employees and moved its headquarters to New York to be closer to its international customer base.

In June 2019, research firm Gartner announced that from 2017 to 2018 UiPath moved from #5 to #1 in RPA market share. In September, UiPath was ranked #3 on the Forbes Cloud 100. The company was the featured cover story of the September 30, 2019 Forbes print edition with UiPath CEO Daniel Dines called "Boss of the Bots."

In October 2019, UiPath announced the acquisition of Ukrainian process documentation company StepShot and Dutch process mining company ProcessGold. Also in October, the company announced UiPath Explorer, a new product using technology from the acquired companies; a robot communication tool called UiPath Apps; a low code robot programming tool called UiPath StudioX; an embedded analytics tool called UiPath Insights; and UiPath Connect, a tool that allowed every employee to find new processes to automate.

In November of the same year, the company reported it had 5,000 customers worldwide, and a developer community of more than 500,000 people. In November, the company was ranked first in the Deloitte Technology Fast 500.

In April 2020, UiPath was named the top tech company and #2 overall in the Financial Times FT1000 ranking of Americas' fastest growing companies 2020. In June, UiPath was named to the CNBC 2020 Disruptor 50 ranking. In September, UiPath was ranked #3 on the Forbes Cloud 100 list for the second consecutive year. On December 17, Bloomberg reported that UiPath filed confidentially for an initial public offering (IPO).

In March 2021, UiPath acquired Cloud Elements, an interconnectivity platform to advance API-based automation capabilities.

In April 2021, UiPath raised $1.3 billion in an initial public offering on the New York Stock Exchange in one of the largest US software IPOs in history.

In July 2022, UiPath acquired Re:infer, a natural language processing developer, for an undisclosed sum.

Products
UiPath develops software to automate repetitive digital tasks normally performed by people. The technology combines emulating how humans read computer screens (AI computer vision), together with APIs, and gives users access to pre-built automation components that can be combined to automate routine processes. Its earlier products simplified tasks performed using other business software such as CRM or ERP systems, in internal and back-office areas like accounting, human resources paperwork, and claims processing. Newer applications of the company's software include coordinating with artificial intelligence systems to simplify repetitive front office tasks including customer management. UiPath's built-in OCR engines from Google, Microsoft, and ABBYY can read information from a screen or scanned document.

UiPath's main product is the UiPath Automation Platform. The platform combines a family of low-code visual integrated development environment (IDE) products called Studio for process creation, with client-side agents called Robots that execute those processes. The processes are deployed, monitored and managed remotely with a central management tool called Orchestrator.

Additional available software includes:

UIPath AI Center (previously AI Fabric) - orchestrates and inserts AI into business processes.
UiPath Action Center - a communication tool for instances where robots need to connect with humans for direction, described by the company as “human in the loop.”
UiPath Apps - a low-code application development platform.
UiPath Assistant - a launchpad for automations that a company provides to its computer workers. It sits on the computer desktop and gives people easy access to selected automations that help them with their tasks.
UiPath Automation Hub (previously UiPath Connect Enterprise) - a tool allows every employee at an organization to help find, suggest and track new processes to automate.
UiPath Document Understanding - software that extracts, interprets and processes data from PDFs, images, handwriting and other communication media.
UiPath Insights - a modular data dashboard that provides analytics for UiPath's automated processes.
UiPath Process Mining (previously ProcessGold) - a tool that uncovers new automation opportunities by analyzing application logs.
UiPath StudioX - a platform with simplified coding that allows workers to build their own robots to simplify their own work.
UiPath Test Suite - automates and centralizes testing to ensure the quality of every automation and application before they go live.

UiPath's software products are available as native software or using the Software as a Service (SaaS) model.

UiPath also hosts the UiPath Academy, to provide job training and certification in the field of Robotic Process Automation.

Funding 
UIPath Funding in millions of $ USD:

References

External links

Business software companies
Automation software
AI companies
Software companies established in 2005
Software companies based in New York City
Software companies of the United States
Romanian companies established in 2005
Software companies of Romania
2021 initial public offerings
Publicly traded companies based in New York City
Companies listed on the New York Stock Exchange